Ridvan Dibra (born 9 January 1959) is an Albanian writer. He was born in Shkodër, Albania, where he graduated from university in Albanian Language and Literature and from 1994 started teaching the very same subject there. An innovative writer, Dibra is a leading figure of contemporary Albanian Literature. He has been rewarded with several national and international prizes, including the Rexhai Surroi Prize for best novel of the year in Albanian speaking territories, for his 2012 novel, "Legjenda e vetmisë" (The Legend of Solitude).
He has been called as one of the five greatest living Albanian writers.

Works 
 Nudo ("The Nude") (1995)
 Kurthet e dritës ("Traps of Light") (1997)
 Triumfi i Gjergj Elez Alisë ("The Triumph of Gjergj Elez Alia") (1999)
 Stina e ujkut ("Season of the Wolf") (2000) 
 Të lirë dhe të burgosur ("The Free and the Imprisoned") (2001)
 Triumfi i dytë i Gjergj Elez Alisë ("The Second Triumph of Gjergj Elez Alia") (2003) 
 Email (2003)
 Kumte dashurie ("Love messages")(2004) 
 Sesilja ose sexonix (2005) 
 Franc Kafka i shkruan të birit ("Franz Kafka writes to his Son") (2007) 
 Stina e maceve ("The Season of the Cats)(2006) 
 Kanuni i Lekës së vogël ("The Kanun of Leka Junior") (2011) 
 Legjenda e vetmisë ("The Legend of Solitude") (2012) 
 Gjumi mbi borë ("Sleeping on Snow") (2016) 
 Treni i muzgut ("The Twilight Train") (2017)
 Dashuritë e virgjëreshës Madalenë ("Virgin Madeleine's Love") (2018)

References

1959 births
Living people
20th-century novelists
21st-century novelists
Albanian novelists
Albanian male writers
Albanian-language writers
21st-century Albanian poets
21st-century Albanian writers
20th-century Albanian poets
Albanian dramatists and playwrights
Albanian male short story writers
Albanian short story writers
20th-century male writers
21st-century male writers